"Shindig" is an instrumental by British group the Shadows, released as a single in September 1963. It peaked at number 6 on the UK Singles Chart.

Release and reception
Unlike the majority of the Shadows' previous singles, recorded at EMI Studios, "Shindig" was recorded at the Jubilee Theatre in Blackpool whilst the group were on tour. It was written by Hank Marvin and Bruce Welch and was released with the B-side "It's Been a Blue Day", written by Brian Bennett.

Reviewed in New Record Mirror, "Shindig" was described as a "change of pace from their last one on this very infectious number from the Shadows. Probably the best and the most different they have made for a long time. The guitar sounds are different on this one, and fast tempo is maintained throughout without any major deviations. Catchy and commercial, watch out for it at the top of the charts". Don Nicholl for Disc write that it has "something of a Western flavour to it" and that it "may lack a little of the impact of previous performances, but which should grow on you, and grow into a steady seller, too.

Track listing
7": Columbia / DB 7106
 "Shindig" – 2:17
 "It's Been a Blue Day" – 2:02

Personnel
 Hank Marvin – acoustic lead guitar
 Bruce Welch – acoustic rhythm guitar
 Brian "Licorice" Locking – electric bass guitar
 Brian Bennett – drums, tambourine

Charts

References

1963 singles
The Shadows songs
Songs written by Bruce Welch
1960s instrumentals
Songs written by Hank Marvin
1963 songs
Columbia Graphophone Company singles
Song recordings produced by Norrie Paramor
Rock instrumentals